Gimma are an ethnic group of Northern Sudan. Most of the members of this group are Muslims. The number of persons in this group is above 100,000.

References
Joshua Project

Ethnic groups in Sudan